Bidens vulgata is a species of flowering plant in the family Asteraceae known by the common names big devils beggarticks and tall beggarticks. It is native to eastern and central North America from Nova Scotia to northern Georgia and as far west as the Rocky Mountains. It is an introduced species on the West Coast of North America as well as parts of Europe.

The leaves are made up of several lance-shaped leaflets each up to 8 centimeters long. The inflorescence produces several small flower heads with centers of yellow disc florets and a fringe of 3 to 5 yellow ray florets a few millimeters in length. Some heads lack ray florets. The fruit is a flattened achene with two sharp barbs at one end. The species grows primarily in wet locations such as swamps, marshes, streambanks, etc.

References

External links
Jepson Manual Treatment

vulgata
Flora of Canada
Flora of the Eastern United States
Flora of the United States
Flora of the Great Lakes region (North America)
Flora of the Great Plains (North America)
Plants described in 1899
Taxa named by Edward Lee Greene